Union Station is a mural in the Short North and Italian Village neighborhoods in Columbus, Ohio. Created by Gregory Ackers, it covers a portion of the north wall of Blick (formerly Utrecht) Art Supplies at 612 N. High St. and depicts the historic Union Station. It was created in 1987  a decade after the station's demolition.

It was located across a parking lot of another well-known Ackers-created mural, Trains. By 2012, the mural was deteriorating, with chipping paint leading to large sections of the mural being lost. The other mural was noted to be in decent shape, however. Around 2014, the hotel Le Méridien Columbus, The Joseph was built on the space that served as a parking lot and both murals can no longer be seen.

References

External links

 
 WOSU feature on the mural and its counterpart

Murals in Columbus, Ohio
Trains in art
Italian Village